Attécoubé (Ebrié: Abidjan Te) is a suburb of and one of the 10 urban communes of Abidjan, Ivory Coast. It is situated to the northwest of Abidjan's central Plateau commune, overlooking the Baie du Banco. The commune forms part of Banco National Park. 

The population was 164,751 in 1988, 214,638 in 1998, and 260,911 in 2014. At the beginning of the colonial era, Attécoubé was exploited by the French for its timber. Its mayor, elected in municipal elections in March 2001, is Danho Paulin.

Districts
Attécoubé is separated into almost three dozen districts. These include:

Right bank

Left bank

Notable people
 
 
Noel Yobou (born 1982), footballer

References

Communes of Abidjan
Suburbs in Ivory Coast